The 12th Circle Chart Music Awards ceremony was held at KSPO Dome in Seoul on February 18, 2023, to recognise the best artists and recordings, primarily based on Circle Music Chart of the year from December 1, 2021, to November 30, 2022. The ceremony was hosted by Doyoung and Miyeon. BTS was the most awarded act with 5 awards, followed by Blackpink with 4.

On July 7, 2022, it was announced the Gaon Chart Music Awards would be renamed to the Circle Chart Music Awards. Rock Entertainment aired the award show across Southeast Asia, with other broadcasters (such as Astro's PRIMEtime and idolplus) to simulcast.

Winners and nominees 
 Nominees

Main awards

Special awards

Performers

Presenters

Notes

References 

2023 in South Korean music
Circle